Mandla Ncikazi (born 16 February 1969) is a South African professional football coach and former player who is part of the technical staff at South African Premier Division club Orlando Pirates.

Career
Ncikazi was born in Hlokozi, KwaZulu-Natal.

Ncikazi played professional football for African Wanderers and AmaZulu before his career was ended by an achilles tendon injury around 2000. He worked as a school teacher and later as a sports officer in the Department of Education.

Ncikazi went into coaching and held roles as assistant coach at African Wanderers, Durban Stars, Lamontville Golden Arrows, Polokwane City, Free State Stars, Maritzburg United and the South African women's team, whilst he was also head coach at Nathi Lions. He was appointed as manager of Maritzburg United in summer 2015 on a two-year deal, but was sacked in September after a poor start to the campaign. He was appointed as assistant head coach to Clinton Larsen in December 2015. On 15 October 2020, he was appointed as head coach of Lamontville Golden Arrows, but left the club by mutual consent in June 2021.

On 18 June 2021, he joined the backroom staff at Orlando Pirates.

References

External links

Living people
1969 births
South African soccer players
AmaZulu F.C. players
Maritzburg United F.C. managers
Lamontville Golden Arrows F.C. managers
South African soccer managers
People from KwaZulu-Natal
Association footballers not categorized by position